The 2019–20 season was Chelsea's 106th competitive season, 31st consecutive season in the top flight of English football, 28th consecutive season in the Premier League, and 114th year in existence as a football club. The season was slated to cover the period from 1 July 2019 to 30 June 2020, but due to the suspension of football due to the COVID-19 pandemic, it was extended to 8 August 2020.

The season was the first since 2011–12 without Eden Hazard, who departed to Real Madrid.

Kits

Management team

Players

Transfers

In

Summer

Winter

Out

Summer

Notes

Winter

Loan out

Summer

Winter

Overall transfer activity

Expenditure
Summer:  £40,500,000

Winter:  £580,000

Total:  £41,080,000

Income
Summer:  £150,800,000

Winter:  £8,830,000

Total:  £159,630,000

Net totals
Summer:  £110,300,000

Winter:  £8,250,000

Total:  £118,550,000

Friendlies

Competitions

Premier League

Tables

Results summary

Results by matchday

Matches

FA Cup

EFL Cup

UEFA Champions League

Group stage
Tables

Matches

Knockout phase

Round of 16

UEFA Super Cup

Statistics

Appearances and goals

Top scorers

Top assists

Clean sheets

Discipline

Summary

Awards

Players

Manager

References

Chelsea F.C. seasons
Chelsea
Chelsea
Chelsea
Chelsea